Edward "Eddie" O'Donnell (April 30, 1887 – November 26, 1920) was an American racecar driver.  He died of injuries sustained in a crash during a AAA-sanctioned national championship race.

Career
O'Donnell started his career as a riding mechanic for Duesenberg racecar driver Eddie Rickenbacker.  When Rickenbacker left the Duesenberg team to join the Peugeot team, O'Donnell took over as driver.  He served as Captain of the Duesenberg team and was highly successful on the dirt tracks and board tracks around the United States, also having raced on the road circuits.

Death
O'Donnell was fatally injured when he and Gaston Chevrolet collided during the Beverly Hills Speedway Classic race on Thanksgiving Day 1920.  Chevrolet was killed as well as O'Donnell's mechanic Lyall Jolls.  O'Donnell died the next morning.

Indianapolis 500 results

References

External links

1887 births
1920 deaths
People from Whitewater, Wisconsin
Racing drivers from Wisconsin
Indianapolis 500 drivers
AAA Championship Car drivers
Racing drivers who died while racing
Sports deaths in California